Tiger Galli is a 2017 Indian Kannada-language action film directed by Ravi Srivatsa and starring Sathish Ninasam and Roshni Prakash.

Cast 
Sathish Ninasam as Vishnu and Shiva
Roshni Prakash as Meera
Yamuna as Durgamma
Bhavana Rao
Shivamani
Ayyappa Sharma
Giriraj
Pooja Lokesh
M. N. Lakshmi Devi

Release 
Deccan Chronicle gave the film a rating of one out of five stars and wrote that "Almost every character is greatly influenced by dialogue king Saikumar’s mannerism and it’s LOUD!". The New Indian Express wrote that "Tiger Galli is limited to those who don’t mind seeing bloodshed, harsh dialogues and several action sequences". The Times of India gave the film a rating of two out of five stars and wrote that "The climax of the film is a bit too stretched and the graphics are a major disappointment".

References

External links 

 Indian action drama films
2010s Kannada-language films